The Killing Had Begun is the third full-length album by German band X Marks the Pedwalk. It was released by Zoth Ommog in Europe as both an LP and CD, and in North America by Cleopatra Records as a CD.

The Killing Had Begun was the first X Marks the Pedwalk album to contain vocals by André Schmechta's wife, Stephanie (who was credited as Estéfania).

Track listing
 "I Promise You a Murder" – 5:05
 "Wipe No Tears" – 4:12
 "Cul-de-Sac" – 4:42
 "No Premonition" – 5:01
 "Worthless" – 4:01
 "Made of Wax" – 4:49
 "My Back" – 4:19
 "The Occurrence" – 5:17
 "Your Eyes" – 6:20
 "Conversion" – 3:24
 "Insight" – 4:02

Personnel
Sevren Ni-arb
Raive Yarx
Estefania

External links
Entry at official X Marks the Pedwalk website.
Entry at Discogs.com

1994 albums
X Marks the Pedwalk albums
Cleopatra Records albums
Zoth Ommog Records albums